Kim Byoung-young (born 9 March 1969) is a South Korean para table tennis coach and former player. He took a gold medal at three consecutive Paralympic Games: 2000, 2004, and 2008, in addition to a silver medal in 2004.

He became disabled in a car accident in 1989, during his compulsory military service. He began playing table tennis in 1992. He has been coaching since his retirement.

References

1969 births
Living people
Table tennis players at the 2000 Summer Paralympics
Table tennis players at the 2004 Summer Paralympics
Table tennis players at the 2008 Summer Paralympics
Table tennis players at the 2012 Summer Paralympics
Medalists at the 2000 Summer Paralympics
Medalists at the 2004 Summer Paralympics
Medalists at the 2008 Summer Paralympics
South Korean male table tennis players
Paralympic silver medalists for South Korea
Paralympic gold medalists for South Korea
Paralympic table tennis players of South Korea
Paralympic medalists in table tennis
Sportspeople from Ulsan
People with paraplegia
FESPIC Games competitors
21st-century South Korean people